The National Mint of Bolivia or the Mint of Potosí (in colonial era) is a mint located in the city of Potosí in Bolivia. It is from this mint that most of the silver shipped through the Spanish Main came.

The coinage minted during its period became so well known in the world that a saying, memorialized by Miguel de Cervantes, came into use: valer un potosí, "to be worth a potosí" (that is, "a fortune").

First mint

Silver mining at Cerro Rico (a mountain of silver ore), a growth of population and a commercial expansion coupled with Potosí's notable height, prompted a necessity to organise a coinage centre. Minting began immediately on the basis of a rudimentary technology that remained for the next 212 years, from 1572 to 1767.

A proposal by the Spanish viceroy Francisco de Toledo, Count of Oropesa set about the initial construction of the first mint. In 1572 the foundations near the Royal Palaces in the Plaza del Regozijo under the auspices of the architect Jerónimo Leto, who finished the work in three years. The overall costs exceeded 8,000 pesos, the equivalent of around ten million dollars in today's currency. Charles III of Spain is said to have remarked on hearing the cost of the mint, "the whole building must be made of pure silver".

Second mint

Following a scandal and the resulting investigation, plans to reform the old factory were abandoned and a new building was erected in the neighbouring plaza del Gato.

The new factory saw its construction begin in 1757 and finish in 1770 amongst a number of difficulties. Hammered coinage, the technique whereby coins were produced by placing a blank piece of metal of the correct weight between two dies, and then striking the upper die with a hammer to produce the required image on both sides, which had been used since the first coins at Potosí continued at the old factory until 1773. Nevertheless, the first screw-press coins were produced in 1767 as used as such until 1869 when moveable steam presses were installed.

Later years and Republican minting 

The Republic of Bolivia was formed on the 6 August 1825. Little after a conflict that stretched 15 years with the support of Simón Bolívar and Antonio José de Sucre, the administrative organization and monetary unit was established, albeit with numerous difficulties. Two years would have to pass, whilst Spanish currencies continued circulating, before the first Republican coin would be struck.

In 1933 the abandoned Mint was used as a headquarters during the Chaco War was fought between Bolivia and Paraguay over control of a great part of the Gran Chaco region of South America. It was subsequently used as a stable for the peasants who traveled to the Potosí market from the countryside.

The colonial and republican machinery is conserved in the mint solely for museum purposes. It is considered one of the most important museums in Bolivia. The building has UNESCO World Heritage status under the City of Potosi listing in 1987.

See also 
 Great Potosi Mint Fraud of 1649

Notes

References

 

Potosí
Government buildings completed in 1770
Bolivia
Architecture in Bolivia
Numismatic museums in South America
Buildings and structures in Potosí Department
Museums in Bolivia
Tourist attractions in Potosí Department
1770 establishments in the Spanish Empire